The following scheduled destinations are served by Blue Panorama Airlines as of October 2021.

Destinations

References

Blue Panorama Airlines